Dardan Shabanhaxhaj (born 23 April 2001) is an Austrian footballer who plays as a winger for Mura, on loan from Sturm Graz.

Career statistics

Club

References

2001 births
Living people
Austrian footballers
Austria under-21 international footballers
Austrian people of Kosovan descent
Austrian people of Albanian descent
Kosovan footballers
Kosovo youth international footballers
Association football wingers
SK Sturm Graz players
Kapfenberger SV players
NŠ Mura players
Austrian Football Bundesliga players
2. Liga (Austria) players
Slovenian PrvaLiga players
Austrian expatriate footballers
Austrian expatriate sportspeople in Slovenia
Expatriate footballers in Slovenia